The Brothers Grunt is an adult animated comedy television series, and the earliest series made by Ed, Edd n Eddy creator Danny Antonucci. It originally aired from August 15, 1994, to April 9, 1995, on MTV. It centers on five humanoids, named Frank, Tony, Bing, Dean and Sammy, who are in search of their lost brother Perry. The series had a short run and was met with a generally negative reception, with many considering it one of the worst animated TV shows ever made.

Overview

Premise
The series centered on an ensemble cast of pale, rubbery, twitchy, yellow-eyed, green-tongued and shirtless humanoids with prominent bulging varicose veins often leaking various noxious bodily fluids who are distantly related to human beings, all of them ostensibly male, wandering around in their boxers. Their main food staple is cheese; nevertheless, they are able to eat other foods (at least potatoes, according to the episode "Not My Potato"). Their single parent is a large, floating, mute and fat male humanoid called Primus Gruntus Maximus, to whom they are born as embryos inside skin warts, much in the way of the Suriname Toad (see Pipa pipa). They live in a monastery in the sewer.

A group is formed, composed of most of the survivors of their species, in a quest to bring back one of their kind, Perry, who has abandoned his involuntary position of "Chosen One" (leader of their order) and is now living the "high life" among human beings (who seem to deal with the bizarre nature of the grunts by ignoring them and pretending everything is normal).In music video segments that are intervened with some episodes, supervised by Kathy Karp, there are additional animated portions of the main characters grunting.

Characters
The main characters were named after famous crooners of the 1950s: Frank (Sinatra), Tony (Bennett), Dean (Martin), Bing (Crosby), Sammy (Davis Jr.), and Perry (Como), all voiced by Doug Parker.

Main
 Perry – a hunchbacked Grunt who became the chosen one in the pilot episode, but escapes due to the pressure of such a title.
 Frank – constantly bites his lips and cares the most about finding Perry.
 Tony – always faces upward due to his broken neck.
 Bing – the largest of the brothers.
 Dean – smiles constantly and is the most easily distracted of the brothers.
 Sammy – a Grunt who puckers his lips due to his lack of teeth and is in love with a lamp.

Major
 Gruntus Poobah – (Doug Parker) The leader of the brotherhood of grunt, he serves as the show's host and explains the plot before each episode. He also appears often in flashbacks when the grunts are in a troubled situation giving them advice.
 Ringo – the Poobah's mute Middle Eastern assistant who has to carry him around on his back due to his grotesque obesity. He also gives him massages and, as shown in the unaired episode "Black Balled Grunt", acts as his muscle.
 The Dıflash Queen – (Jennifer Wilson) A Turkish Queen that appeared in the episode "Scrub Me Sammy".
 Primus Gruntus Maximumus – (Doug Parker) A floating fat and mute giant and the male parent of the grunts. All grunts are born or hatched from warts on his back.
 The Dıflash Queen's İgnam lamp – (Jennifer Wilson) A Turkish lamp belonging to Sammy.
 The Smein – (Doug Parker) A Nazi German skunk that appeared in the lost episode "Hunt for Grunts".
 Krischmäßante – (Doug Parker) The Smein's best friend skunk.
 Santa Claus (St. Nicholas or especially Kris Kringle) – (Doug Parker) An obese present bringer that appeared in the lost episode "The Grunts Who Came for Turkey."

The characters that would become The Brothers Grunt were first seen in one of MTV's numerous 30-second promos. This particular promo consisted of close-up shots of the then-unnamed character's faces who seemed to be straining to do something (veins in their heads would bulge, the characters would squint and grunt) until the scene cut to the MTV logo landing in a pool of sludge followed by a satisfied "Ahhhhh" (suggesting that the characters were suffering from constipation and the MTV logo was the 'turd' as it were). It is unclear when this promo aired if the storyline and characters for The Brothers Grunt had been developed already or if it had been developed into its own show after the success of the promo, in the wake of Beavis and Butt-head.

Production
The show's origins can be traced back to 1993 when the MTV ad "Grunt MTV" aired. At the time Danny Antonucci had animated several MTV ads to find work outside of International Rocketship Ltd., who he had worked for since 1984. Although Danny enjoyed the success of Lupo The Butcher, he wanted to leave International Rocketship Ltd. and start his own animation company. The result was a.k.a. Cartoon, which began on April 1, 1994. The studio began as a way to locate his work for The Brothers Grunt after MTV executive Abby Terkhule liked his MTV ad so much, he asked him to turn it into a television series. In production order, each episode of the show would consist of three to four segments.

Reception
The Brothers Grunt had a short run and was met with generally negative reception from critics. Kenneth R. Clark of the Chicago Tribune said that, with the series, MTV "created the most repulsive creatures ever to show up on a television screen" and "accomplished the seemingly impossible." Charles Solomon of the Los Angeles Times called the show "an effortful, sophomoric half-hour that leaves the viewer longing for the refined good taste of Alice Cooper." In their book North of Everything: English-Canadian Cinema Since 1980, William Beard and Jerry White called the series a "failure".

Comparison to Aaahh!!! Real Monsters
The show was often compared to Aaahh!!! Real Monsters, an animated series that aired on MTV's sister channel, Nickelodeon. Gábor Csupó, co-creator of Aaahh!!! Real Monsters, rejected these comparisons, claiming that his show was more character-driven, while The Brothers Grunt was an idea-driven series, also pointing out that both shows have different visual styles. When looking back on the series, creator Danny Antonucci stated that the series "didn't really do too well", also saying that the show has since become MTV's "dirty little secret".

Episodes
Note: All episodes directed by Danny Antonucci

Unreleased episodes
These episodes are unreleased, but have been uploaded to YouTube in June 2019 by YouTube user Oecobius33. Three of these episodes might have been produced, but are currently unconfirmed.

Merchandise
Fleer released in 1995 trading cards based on the series, as part of the MTV Animation Fleer's Ultra set. The show's theme song, written by Brendan Dolan and Geoff Whelan, was featured in  Television's Greatest Hits: Volume 7, which was released in 1996 by TVT Records' soundtrack imprint, TVT SOUNDTRAX.

There were also few tshirts, boxer shorts, socks and calendars sold to promote the show between 1994-95.

See also
1995 in television
List of television shows considered the worst

References

External links
 
 The Brothers Grunt at the Big Cartoon DataBase

1990s American adult animated television series
1990s American animated comedy television series
1994 American television series debuts
1995 American television series endings
1990s Canadian adult animated television series
1990s Canadian animated comedy television series
1994 Canadian television series debuts
1995 Canadian television series endings
American adult animated comedy television series
Canadian adult animated comedy television series
English-language television shows
MTV cartoons
A.k.a. Cartoon
Television series created by Danny Antonucci
Animated television series about brothers